A Notorious Gentleman is a 1935 American drama film directed by Edward Laemmle and written by Leopold Atlas, Rufus King and Robert Tasker. The film stars Charles Bickford, Helen Vinson, Onslow Stevens, Dudley Digges, Sidney Blackmer and John Darrow. The film was released on January 21, 1935, by Universal Pictures. The film was remade in 1946 as Smooth as Silk.

Plot

Cast 
Charles Bickford as Kirk Arlen
Helen Vinson as Nina Thorne
Onslow Stevens as John Barrett
Dudley Digges as Marleybone
Sidney Blackmer as Clayton Bradford
John Darrow as Terry Bradford
John Larkin as Joshua
George Irving as Judge Holman
Evelyn Selbie as Carlena
Alyce Ardell as Maid

References

External links 
 

1935 films
American drama films
1935 drama films
Universal Pictures films
Films directed by Edward Laemmle
American black-and-white films
Films with screenplays by Florence Ryerson
1930s English-language films
1930s American films